Leszek Pisz (born 18 December 1966 in Dębica) is a former Polish footballer who plays as a midfielder.

History 
Pisz arrived in Legia Warszawa in 1986 from Igloopol Dębica. At first, he was a substitute, but later he became a star of the team. He was known as a free-kicks specialist, scoring many goals from dead-ball situations.

In 1995, Legia won the Polish Premier League and qualified for the Champions League, where the team made it to the quarterfinals. Pisz performed admirably in Legia's first group match against Rosenborg BK, scoring two goals, including the tying goal for Legia. That made him the first player to score for a Polish team during Champions League group stages.

Pisz later moved to Greece, before returning to Poland and ending his career in 2002.

References

External links

1966 births
Living people
Polish footballers
Poland international footballers
Polish expatriate footballers
Association football midfielders
Igloopol Dębica players
Legia Warsaw players
Ekstraklasa players
PAOK FC players
Paniliakos F.C. players
Kavala F.C. players
Śląsk Wrocław players
Pogoń Staszów players
Super League Greece players
Expatriate footballers in Greece
Polish expatriate sportspeople in Greece
People from Dębica
Sportspeople from Podkarpackie Voivodeship